Edward Anthony Sukla (March 3, 1943 – September 24, 2015) was an American professional baseball player, a right-handed relief pitcher who appeared in 39 games over portions of three seasons (1964–66) for the Los Angeles / California Angels of Major League Baseball. He signed with the Angels in 1962 after graduating from high school in Huntington Beach, California.

On April 20, 1966, Sukla was the winning pitcher in the second game ever played at Anaheim Stadium—the first triumph ever recorded by the Angels in their new home ballpark. He hurled 1 scoreless innings against the Chicago White Sox, allowing no hits with two bases on balls and one strikeout, as the Angels defeated the Chicago White Sox 4–3 in extra innings. It would be the third and last victory of Sukla's big-league career.

Sent to the minor leagues after May 22, Sukla went on to pitch another ten seasons in pro ball. His 14-year career included a dozen seasons in the Triple-A Pacific Coast League.  He retired from the field after the 1975 season. In the majors, he lost five of eight decisions and logged four saves during his 39-game career. He allowed 52 hits and 17 bases on balls in 51 innings pitched, with 26 strikeouts. His career earned run average was 5.26.  In the minors, he worked in 492 games and posted a 78–59 record in 1,141 innings pitched.

After retiring from the mound, Sukla became a scout for the Major League Baseball Scouting Bureau and was named "Scout of the Year" in 2007. He died at age 72 in Irvine, California following a 9-year battle with osteosarcoma.

References

External links

Obituary from the Orange County Register

1943 births
2015 deaths
Baseball players from Long Beach, California
California Angels players
Deaths from bone cancer
Deaths from cancer in California
Eugene Emeralds players
Hawaii Islanders players
Los Angeles Angels players
Major League Baseball pitchers
Major League Baseball scouts
Phoenix Giants players
Quad Cities Angels players
San Jose Bees players
Seattle Angels players
Sportspeople from Huntington Beach, California